"In the Deathroom" is a horror short story by American writer  Stephen King. It first appeared in the 1999 audiobook Blood and Smoke. In 2000, it was first published in written form in Secret Windows. In 2002, it was collected in King's collection Everything's Eventual.

Author's note
Stephen King included this note with the story in Everything's Eventual: "This is a slightly Kafka-esque story about an interrogation room in the South American version of Hell. In such stories, the fellow being interrogated usually ends up spilling everything and then being killed (or losing his mind). I wanted to write one with a happier ending, however unreal that might be. And here it is."

Plot summary
Fletcher, a former reporter from The New York Times, has been captured by members of a South American dictatorship. The story begins as he is brought into the titular "deathroom" for interrogation about an allegedly communist insurgency, which he has been supporting due to the government's killing of a group of nuns which included his sister. Fletcher realizes that his captors, despite their promises to the contrary, will not let him leave the room alive.

During the course of his interrogation, Fletcher manages to keep calm, and hatches a desperate plan to escape, which, to his surprise, actually works. He fakes an epileptic seizure and, in the captors' struggle to save him, steals a gun. After killing three of his captors and maiming one, he escapes the deathroom. Fletcher, having no way of knowing if the gunfire was heard, starts up the stairs to see if he can escape.

The story ends with a man, almost certainly Fletcher, buying a pack of cigarettes at a newsstand kiosk in New York.

See also
 Stephen King short fiction bibliography

External links

2000 short stories
Short stories by Stephen King